This is a list of official, or otherwise administratively-recognized, languages of sovereign countries, regions, and supra-national institutions. The article also lists lots of languages which have no administrative mandate as an official language, generally describing these as de facto official languages.

Official languages of sovereign countries, wholly or partly

A 
Abkhaz:
 Abkhazia (with Russian; independence is disputed)

Afar:
 Djibouti (with Arabic, French, Somali)

Afrikaans:
 Namibia (with English and German)
 South Africa (with English, Ndebele, Northern Sotho, Sotho, Swati, Tsonga, Tswana, Venda, Xhosa, Zulu)

Aja-Gbe:
 Benin (a national language along with Anii, Bariba, Biali, Boko, Dendi, Fon-Gbe, Foodo, Fula, Gen-Gbe, Lukpa, Mbelime, Nateni, Tammari, Waama, Waci-Gbe, Yobe, Yom, Xwela-Gbe, Yoruba, the official language is French)

Akan (Akuapem Twi, Asante Twi, Fante):
 Ghana (a government-sponsored language along with Ewe-Gbe, Dagaare, Dagbani, Dangme, Ga, Gonja, Kasem, Nzema, the official language is English)

Albanian:
 Albania
 Kosovo (with Serbian)
 
 North Macedonia (with Macedonian)

Amharic:
 Ethiopia

Anii:
 Benin (a national language along with Aja-Gbe, Bariba, Biali, Boko, Dendi, Fon-Gbe, Foodo, Fula, Gen-Gbe, Lukpa, Mbelime, Nateni, Tammari, Waama, Waci-Gbe, Yobe, Yom, Xwela-Gbe, Yoruba, the official languages is French)

Arabic (see also List of countries where Arabic is an official language):
 Algeria (with Berber)
 Bahrain
 Chad (with French)
 Comoros (with French and Comorian)
 Djibouti (with French)
 Egypt
 Eritrea (with Tigrinya and English)
 Iraq (with Kurdish)
Israel (with Hebrew)
 Jordan
 Kuwait
 Lebanon
 Libya
 Mali (with Tuareg and French)
 Mauritania (with several national languages: Fula, Soninke, Wolof)
 Morocco (with Berber)
 Niger (with French, Buduma, Fula, Gourmanché, Hausa, Kanuri, Songhay-Zarma, Tamasheq, Tasawaq, Tebu)
 Oman 
 Palestine
 Qatar
 Saudi Arabia
 Somaliland (with English and Somali; independence is disputed)
 Somalia (with Somali)
 Sudan (with English)
 Syria
 Tunisia
 United Arab Emirates
 Yemen

Armenian:
 Armenia
 Artsakh (independence disputed)

Assamese:
 India (with 21 other regional languages, and with English as a link language)

Aymara:
 Bolivia (with Spanish, Quechua, Guaraní and 33 other languages)
 Peru (with Spanish and Quechua and other languages)

Azerbaijani:
 Azerbaijan

B 

Balanta:
 Senegal (a national language along with Bassari, Bedik, Fula, Hassaniya, Jola, Mandinka, Mandjak, Mankanya, Noon, Safen, Serer, Soninke, Wolof, the official language is French)

Bambara:
 see Manding
 Mali (a national language along with Bomu, Bozo, Dogon, Fula, Mamara, Songhay, Soninke, Syenara, Tamasheq, the official language is French)

Bariba:
 Benin (a national language along with Aja-Gbe, Anii, Biali, Boko, Dendi, Fon-Gbe, Foodo, Fula, Gen-Gbe, Lukpa, Mbelime, Nateni, Tammari, Waama, Waci-Gbe, Yobe, Yom, Xwela-Gbe, Yoruba, the official languages is French)

Basque:
 Co-official in some autonomous communities of Spain:
 Basque Country
 Navarre; both with Spanish

Bassari:
 Senegal (a national language along with Balanta, Bedik, Fula, Hassaniya, Jola, Mandinka, Mandjak, Mankanya, Noon, Safen, Serer, Soninke, Wolof, the official language is French)

Bedik:
 Senegal (a national language along with Balanta, Bassari, Fula, Hassaniya, Jola, Mandinka, Mandjak, Mankanya, Noon, Safen, Serer, Soninke, Wolof, the official language is French)

Belarusian:
 Belarus (with Russian)

Bengali:
 Bangladesh
 India (with 21 other regional languages, and with English as a link language)
 Sierra Leone

Berber:
 Algeria (with Arabic)
 Morocco (with Arabic)

Biali:
 Benin (a national language along with Aja-Gbe, Anii, Bariba, Boko, Dendi, Fon-Gbe, Foodo, Fula, Gen-Gbe, Lukpa, Mbelime, Nateni, Tammari, Waama, Waci-Gbe, Yobe, Yom, Xwela-Gbe, Yoruba, the official languages is French)

Bislama:
 Vanuatu (with English and French)

Boko:
 Benin (a national language along with Aja-Gbe, Anii, Bariba, Biali, Dendi, Fon-Gbe, Foodo, Fula, Gen-Gbe, Lukpa, Mbelime, Nateni, Tammari, Waama, Waci-Gbe, Yobe, Yom, Xwela-Gbe, Yoruba, the official languages is French)

Bomu:
 Mali (a national language along with Bambara, Bozo, Dogon, Fula, Mamara, Songhay, Soninke, Syenara, Tamasheq, the official language is French)

Bosnian:
 Bosnia and Herzegovina (with Croatian, Serbian) (de facto)

Bozo:
 Mali (a national language along with Bambara, Bomu, Dogon, Fula, Mamara, Songhay, Soninke, Syenara, Tamasheq, the official language is French)

Buduma:
 Niger (with French, Arabic, Fula, Gourmanché, Hausa, Kanuri, Songhay-Zarma, Tamasheq, Tasawaq, Tebu)

Bulgarian:
 Bulgaria

Burmese:
 Myanmar (formerly Burma)

C 
Cantonese:
 Hong Kong (using Traditional Chinese characters); with Mandarin Chinese and English 
 Macau (using Traditional Chinese characters); with Mandarin Chinese and Portuguese

Catalan:
 Andorra, 
 Co-official in some autonomous communities of Spain:
 Balearic Islands
 Catalonia
 Valencian Community; all with Spanish

Chinese, Mandarin:
 Mainland China (using Simplified Chinese characters)
 Macau (using both Simplified Chinese characters and Traditional Chinese characters)
 Hong Kong (using both Simplified Chinese characters and Traditional Chinese characters; with Cantonese and English)
 Singapore (using Simplified Chinese characters; with English, Malay and Tamil)
 Taiwan (using Traditional Chinese characters; other official languages of Taiwan are Formosan languages, Taiwanese Hokkien, Hakka and Taiwan Sign Language.)

Chichewa:
 Malawi (with English)
 Zimbabwe (with English, Shona, Ndebele, Chirbawe, Kalanga, "Koisan" (Tshuwau), Nambya, Ndau, Zimbabwean sign language, Tonga, Tswana, Venda, Xhosa)

Chirbawe (Sena):
 see Sena

Comorian
 Comoros (with Arabic and French)
Corsican :

 France (with French)
 Corsica

Croatian:
 Croatia
 Bosnia and Herzegovina (with Bosnian and Serbian) (de facto)

Czech:
 Czech Republic
 Slovakia (legislation states that a person using Czech language at a Slovak institution must be treated as if using Slovak language)

D 
Dagaare:
 Ghana (a government-sponsored language along with Akan (Akuapem Twi, Ashante Twi, Fante), Ewe-Gbe, Dagbani, Dangme, Ga, Gonja, Kasem, Nzema, the official language is English)

Dagbani:
 Ghana (a government-sponsored language along with Akan (Akuapem Twi, Ashante Twi, Fante), Ewe-Gbe, Dagaare, Dangme, Ga, Gonja, Kasem, Nzema, the official language is English)

Dangme
 Ghana (a government-sponsored language along with Akan (Akuapem Twi, Ashante Twi, Fante), Ewe-Gbe, Dagaare, Dagbani, Ga, Gonja, Kasem, Nzema, the official language is English)

Danish:
 Denmark
 Faroe Islands (with Faroese)

Dari:
 Afghanistan (a local variant of Persian, but defined as "Dari" in the Afghan constitution; together with Pashto)

Dendi:
 Benin (a national language along with Aja-Gbe, Anii, Bariba, Biali, Boko, Fon-Gbe, Foodo, Fula, Gen-Gbe, Lukpa, Mbelime, Nateni, Tammari, Waama, Waci-Gbe, Yobe, Yom, Xwela-Gbe, Yoruba, the official languages is French)

Dhivehi:
 Maldives

Dioula:
 see Manding
 Burkina Faso (a national language along with Fula, Mossi and other languages, the official language is French)

Dogon:
 Mali (a national language along with Bambara, Bomu, Bozo, Fula, Mamara, Songhay, Soninke, Syenara, Tamasheq, the official language is French)

Dutch:
 Belgium (official language with French and German)
sole official language in:
Flanders
co-official language in:
Brussels (with French)
 The Netherlands (sole official language in every province except Friesland, where West Frisian is co-official and the BES islands, where Papiamento and English are co-official)
 Aruba (with Papiamento)
 Curaçao (with Papiamento and English)
 Sint Maarten (with English)
 Suriname

Dzongkha:
 Bhutan

E 

English (see also List of countries where English is an official language):
 Antigua and Barbuda
 Australia
 The Bahamas
 Barbados
 Belize
 Botswana (but the national language is Tswana)
 Cameroon (with French)
 Canada (with French)
 Ontario (de facto; with limited French)
 Quebec (with French)
 Nova Scotia (de facto; with limited French & Gaelic)
 New Brunswick (with French)
 Manitoba (with French)
 British Columbia (de facto; with limited French)
 Prince Edward Island (de facto; with limited French)
 Saskatchewan (de facto; with limited French)
 Alberta (de facto; with limited French)
 Newfoundland and Labrador (de facto; with limited French, Innu-aimun, & Inuttut)
 Northwest Territories (with 10 others)
 Yukon (with French)
 Nunavut (with Inuit & French)
 Curaçao (with Dutch and Papiamento)
 Dominica
 England
 Eritrea (with Tigrinya and Arabic)
 Eswatini (with Swati)
 Fiji (with Bau Fijian and Hindustani)
 The Gambia
 Ghana (with Akan (Akuapem Twi, Ashante Twi, Fante), Ewe-Gbe, Dagaare, Dagbani, Dangme, Ga, Gonja, Kasem, Nzema)
 Grenada
 Guyana
 Hong Kong (with Cantonese and Mandarin Chinese)
 India (with 22 regional languages)
 Republic of Ireland ("second official"; with Irish)
 Jamaica
 Kenya (with Swahili)
 Kiribati
 Lesotho (with Sotho)
 Liberia
 Malawi (with Chichewa)
 Malaysia (de facto official language with Malay; still serves as official and national language with Malay in Sabah and Sarawak)
 Malta (with Maltese)
 Marshall Islands (with Marshallese)
 Mauritius (with French)
 Micronesia, Federated States of
 Namibia (Afrikaans, German, and Oshiwambo are spoken regionally)
 Nauru (with Nauruan)
 New Zealand (with Māori and New Zealand Sign Language)
 Nigeria (with Hausa, Igbo and Yoruba)
 Pakistan (with Urdu as the national language)
 Palau (with Palauan)
 Papua New Guinea (with Tok Pisin and Hiri Motu)
 Philippines (with Filipino)
 Rwanda (with French and Kinyarwanda)
 Saint Kitts and Nevis
 Saint Lucia
 Saint Vincent and the Grenadines
 Samoa (with Samoan)
 Seychelles (with Seychellois Creole and French)
 Sierra Leone
 Singapore (with Chinese, Malay, Tamil)
 Sint Maarten (with Dutch)
 Solomon Islands
 Somaliland (with Arabic and Somali; independence is disputed)
 South Africa (with Afrikaans, Ndebele, Northern Sotho, Sotho, Swati, Tsonga, Tswana, Venda, Xhosa, Zulu)
 South Sudan
 Sri Lanka (with Sinhala and Tamil)
 Sudan (with Arabic)
 Tanzania (with Swahili)
 Tonga (with Tongan)
 Trinidad and Tobago
 Tuvalu (with Tuvaluan)
 Uganda (with Swahili)
 United Kingdom (de facto; individual countries in the UK have statutorily defined official languages, but the UK as a whole does not)
 United States (de facto; the United States has no administratively mandated official language)
 Vanuatu (with Bislama and French)
 Zambia
 Zimbabwe (with Shona, Ndebele, Chewa, Chirbawe, Kalanga, "Koisan" (Tshuwau), Nambya, Ndau, Zimbabwean sign language, Tonga, Tswana, Venda, Xhosa)

Estonian:
 Estonia

Ewe-Gbe:
 Ghana (a government-sponsored language along with Akan (Akuapem Twi, Ashante Twi, Fante), Dagaare, Dagbani, Dangme Ga, Gonja, Kasem, Nzema, the official language is English)
 Togo (with French and Kabye)

F 
Faroese:

 Faroe Islands
 Denmark

Fijian:
 Fiji (with English and Hindustani)

Filipino:
 Philippines (with English)

Finnish:
 Finland (with Swedish)

Fon-Gbe:
 Benin (a national language along with Aja-Gbe, Anii, Bariba, Biali, Boko, Dendi, Fon-Gbe, Foodo, Fula, Gen-Gbe, Lukpa, Mbelime, Nateni, Tammari, Waama, Waci-Gbe, Yobe, Yom, Xwela-Gbe, Yoruba, the official languages is French)

Foodo:
 Benin (a national language along with Aja-Gbe, Anii, Bariba, Biali, Boko, Dendi, Fon-Gbe, Fula, Gen-Gbe, Lukpa, Mbelime, Nateni, Tammari, Waama, Waci-Gbe, Yobe, Yom, Xwela-Gbe, Yoruba, the official languages is French)

Formosan:
 Taiwan (other national languages of Taiwan are Mandarin, Taiwanese Hokkien, Hakka and Taiwan Sign Language.)

French (see also List of countries where French is an official language):
 Belgium (official language with Dutch and German)
sole official language in:
 Wallonia (except for the Canton of Eupen and the Canton of Sankt Vith, where German is the official language)
co-official language in:
Brussels (with Dutch)
 Benin (with several national languages: Aja-Gbe, Anii, Bariba, Biali, Boko, Dendi, Fon-Gbe, Foodo, Fula, Gen-Gbe, Lukpa, Mbelime, Nateni, Tammari, Waama, Waci-Gbe, Yobe, Yom, Xwela-Gbe, Yoruba)
 Burkina Faso (with several national languages including Dioula, Fula, Mossi)
 Burundi (with Kirundi)
 Cameroon (with English)
 Canada (with English)
 Quebec (with limited English)
 New Brunswick (with English)
 Manitoba (with English)
 Northwest Territories (with 10 others)
 Yukon (with English)
 Nunavut (with Inuit & English)
 Central African Republic (with Sango)
 Chad (with Arabic)
 Comoros (with Arabic and Comorian)
 Ivory Coast
 Democratic Republic of the Congo
 Djibouti (with Arabic)
 Equatorial Guinea (with Spanish and Portuguese)
 France
 French Guiana
 French Polynesia
 French Loyalty Islands
 French Southern and Antarctic Lands
 Scattered islands in the Indian Ocean
 Guadeloupe
 Martinique
 Mayotte
 New Caledonia
 Réunion
 Saint Barthélemy
 Saint Martin
 Saint Pierre and Miquelon
 Wallis and Futuna
 (Adelie Land)
 (Clipperton Island)
 Gabon
 Guernsey (with English)
 Guinea (with several national languages: Fula, Kissi, Kpelle, Malinke, Susu, Toma, Oniyan, Wamey)
 Haiti (with Haitian Creole)
 Italy 
 Aosta Valley (with Italian)
 Jersey (with English)
 Luxembourg (with German and Luxembourgish)
 Madagascar (with Malagasy)
 Mali (with several national languages: Bambara, Bomu, Bozo, Dogon, Fula, Mamara, Songhay, Soninke, Syenara, Tamasheq)
 Mauritius (with English)
 Monaco
 Niger (with Arabic, Buduma, Fula, Gourmanché, Hausa, Kanuri, Songhay-Zarma, Tamasheq, Tasawaq, Tebu)
 Rwanda (with English and Kinyarwanda)
 Senegal (with several national languages: Balanta, Bassari, Bedik, Fula, Hassaniya, Jola, Mandinka, Mandjak, Mankanya, Noon, Safen, Serer, Soninke, Wolof)
 Seychelles (with Seychellois Creole and English)
 Switzerland (National and official language with German, Italian, and (Romansh))
Official language in:
Canton of Geneva
Canton of Vaud
Canton of Jura
Canton of Neuchâtel
Canton of Fribourg (with German)
Canton of Berne (with German)
Canton of Valais (with German)
 Togo (with Ewe-Gbe and Kabye)
 Vanuatu (with Bislama and English)

Fula:
 Benin (a national language along with Aja-Gbe, Anii, Bariba, Biali, Boko, Dendi, Fon-Gbe, Foodo, Gen-Gbe, Lukpa, Mbelime, Nateni, Tammari, Waama, Waci-Gbe, Yobe, Yom, Xwela-Gbe, Yoruba, the official languages is French)
 Burkina Faso (a national language along with Dioula, Mossi and other languages, the official language is French)
 Guinea (a national language along with Kissi, Kpelle, Malinke, Susu, Toma, Oniyan, Wamey, the official language is French)
 Mali (a national language along with Bambara, Bomu, Bozo, Dogon, Mamara, Songhay, Soninke, Syenara, Tamasheq, the official language is French)
 Mauritania (a national language along with Soninke, Wolof, the official language is Arabic)
 Niger (with French, Arabic, Buduma, Gourmanché, Hausa, Kanuri, Songhay-Zarma, Tamasheq, Tasawaq, Tebu)
 Senegal (a national language along with Balanta, Bassari, Bedik, Hassaniya, Jola, Mandinka, Mandjak, Mankanya, Noon, Safen, Serer, Soninke, Wolof, the official language is French)

G 
Ga:
 Ghana (a government-sponsored language along with Akan (Akuapem Twi, Ashante Twi, Fante), Ewe-Gbe, Dagaare, Dagbani, Dangme, Gonja, Kasem, Nzema, the official language is English)

Gàidhlig:
 Scotland (along with English and Scots)

Gbe:
 see Aja-Gbe, Ewe-Gbe, Fon-Gbe, Gen-Gbe, Waci-Gbe, Xwela-Gbe

Gen-Gbe:
 Benin (a national language along with Aja-Gbe, Anii, Bariba, Biali, Boko, Dendi, Fon-Gbe, Foodo, Fula, Lukpa, Mbelime, Nateni, Tammari, Waama, Waci-Gbe, Yobe, Yom, Xwela-Gbe, Yoruba, the official languages is French)

Georgian:
 Georgia
 South Ossetia (with Ossetian and Russian; independence is disputed)
 Abkhazia (with Georgian according to the Georgian constitution; independence is disputed)

German:
 Austria (with Hungarian, Burgenland Croatian, and Slovene)
 Belgium (official language with Dutch and French)
sole official language in:
 Canton of Eupen
 Canton of Sankt Vith
 Brazil 
 Antônio Carlos
 Santa Maria do Herval
 Domingos Martins
 Laranja da Terra
 Pancas
 Santa Maria de Jetibá
 Vila Pavão
 Pomerode
 Canguçu
 Germany
 Liechtenstein
 Luxembourg (with French and Luxembourgish)
 Italy (in South Tyrol)
 Namibia (with Afrikaans and English)
 Switzerland (National and official language with French, Italian, and (Romansh))

Official language in 21 cantons:
17 of the 26 cantons (monolingually German)
Canton of Grisons (with Italian and Romansh)
Canton of Berne (with French)
Canton of Fribourg (with French)
Canton of Valais (with French)

Gonja:
 Ghana (a government-sponsored language along with Akan (Akuapem Twi, Ashante Twi, Fante), Ewe-Gbe, Dagaare, Dagbani, Dangme, Ga, Kasem, Nzema, the official language is English)

Gourmanché
 Niger (with French, Arabic, Buduma, Fula, Hausa, Kanuri, Songhay-Zarma, Tamasheq, Tasawaq, Tebu)

Greek:
 Greece
 Cyprus (with Turkish)
 Albania (Greek Minority Zone of Himara, Finiq and Dervican with Albanian)

Guaraní:
 Paraguay (with Spanish)
 Bolivia (with Spanish, Quechua, Aymara and 33 other languages)

Gujarati:
 India

H 

Haitian Creole:
 Haiti (with French)

Hakka:
 Taiwan (other national languages of Taiwan are Mandarin, Taiwanese Hokkien, Formosan languages and Taiwan Sign Language.)

Hassaniya:
 Senegal (a national language along with Balanta, Bassari, Bedik, Fula, Jola, Mandinka, Mandjak, Mankanya, Noon, Safen, Serer, Soninke, Wolof, the official language is French)

Hausa:
 Niger (with French, Arabic, Buduma, Fula, Gourmanché, Kanuri, Songhay-Zarma, Tamasheq, Tasawaq, Tebu)
 Nigeria (with English, Igbo and Yoruba)

Hebrew:
 Israel (with Arabic)

Hindi:
 India ("official language of the Union"; with English; 21 other regional languages namely Assamese, Bengali, Bodo, Dogri, Gujarati, Kannada, Kashmiri, Konkani, Maithili, Malayalam, Meitei (Manipuri), Marathi, Nepali, Odia, Punjabi, Sanskrit, Santhali, Sindhi, Tamil, Telugu, Urdu)
 Fiji (with English and Bau Fijian; known constitutionally as Hindustani as an umbrella term to cover Urdu, as well as Hindi)

Hiri Motu:
 Papua New Guinea (with English and Tok Pisin)

Hungarian:
 Hungary

I 

Igbo:
 Nigeria (with English, Hausa and Yoruba)

Icelandic:
 Iceland

Indonesian:
 Indonesia (a standardized dialect of Malay)

Irish:
 Republic of Ireland ("national"; with English being "second official")

Italian:
 Italy
 Croatia
 Istria County (with Croatian)
 San Marino
 Slovenia 
 Slovenian Istria (with Slovene)
 Switzerland (National and official language with French, German, and (Romansh))

Official language in:
Canton of Ticino
Canton of Grisons (with German and Romansh)
 Vatican City (with Latin)

J 

Japanese:
 Japan (de facto)
 Palau (Angaur)

Javanese:
 native to Java; Indonesia

Jola:
 Senegal (a national language along with Balanta, Bassari, Bedik, Fula, Hassaniya, Mandinka, Mandjak, Mankanya, Noon, Safen, Serer, Soninke, Wolof, the official language is French)

K 

Kabye:
 Togo (with French and Ewe-Gbe)

Kalanga:
 Zimbabwe (with English, Shona, Ndebele, Chewa, Chirbawe, Tshuwau ("Koisan"), Nambya, Ndau, Zimbabwean sign language, Tonga, Tswana, Venda, Xhosa)

Kannada:

India (with 21 other regional Languages, and with English as a link language)

Kanuri:
 Niger (with French, Arabic, Buduma, Fula, Gourmanché, Hausa, Songhay-Zarma, Tamasheq, Tasawaq, Tebu)

Kasem:
 Ghana (a government-sponsored language along with Akan (Akuapem Twi, Ashante Twi, Fante), Ewe-Gbe, Dagaare, Dagbani, Dangme, Ga, Gonja, Nzema, the official language is English)

Kazakh:
 Kazakhstan (with Russian)

Khmer:
 Cambodia

Kinyarwanda:
 Rwanda (with French and English)

Kirundi:
 Burundi (with French)

Kissi
 Guinea (a national language along with Fula, Kpelle, Malinke, Susu, Toma, Oniyan, Wamey, the official language is French)

"Koisan" (Tshuwau):
 Zimbabwe (with English, Shona, Ndebele, Chewa, Chirbawe, Kalanga, Nambya, Ndau, Zimbabwean sign language, Tonga, Tswana, Venda, Xhosa)

Korean:
 North Korea
 South Korea (with Korean Sign Language)

Korean Sign Language:
 South Korea (with Korean)

Kpelle:
 Guinea (a national language along with Fula, Kissi, Malinke, Susu, Toma, Oniyan, Wamey, the official language is French)

Kurdish:
 Iraq (with Arabic)

Kyrgyz:
 Kyrgyzstan (with Russian)

L 

Lao:
 Laos
Latin:

 Holy See
 Hungary
 Croatia
 Poland

Latvian:
 Latvia

Lithuanian:
 Lithuania

Lukpa:
 Benin (a national language along with Aja-Gbe, Anii, Bariba, Biali, Boko, Dendi, Fon-Gbe, Foodo, Fula, Gen-Gbe, Mbelime, Nateni, Tammari, Waama, Waci-Gbe, Yobe, Yom, Xwela-Gbe, Yoruba, the official languages is French)

Luxembourgish:
 Luxembourg (with French and German)

M 

Macedonian:
 North Macedonia (with Albanian)

Malagasy:
 Madagascar (with French)

Malay:
 Malaysia (with de facto official language English)
 Brunei
 Singapore (with English, Chinese and Tamil)
 Indonesia (a standardized local dialect of Malay, but treated as the separate language in Indonesia)

Malinke:
 see Manding
 Guinea (a national language along with Fula, Kissi, Kpelle, Susu, Toma, Oniyan, Wamey, the official language is French)

Maltese:
 Malta (with English)

Mamara:
 Mali (a national language along with Bambara, Bomu, Bozo, Dogon, Fula, Songhay, Soninke, Syenara, Tamasheq, the official language is French)

Manding (Mandinka, Malinke):
 see Bambara, Dioula, Malinke, Mandinka

Mandinka:
 see Manding
 Senegal (a national language along with Balanta, Bassari, Bedik, Fula, Hassaniya, Jola, Mandjak, Mankanya, Noon, Safen, Serer, Soninke, Wolof, the official language is French)

Mandjak:
 Senegal (a national language along with Balanta, Bassari, Bedik, Fula, Hassaniya, Jola, Mandinka, Mankanya, Noon, Safen, Serer, Soninke, Wolof, the official language is French)

Mankanya:
 Senegal (a national language along with Balanta, Bassari, Bedik, Fula, Hassaniya, Jola, Mandinka, Mandjak, Noon, Safen, Serer, Soninke, Wolof, the official language is French)

Manx Gaelic:
 Isle of Man (with English)

Māori:
 New Zealand (with English and New Zealand Sign Language)

Marshallese:
 Marshall Islands (with English)

Mauritian Creole 
 Mauritius

Mbelime:
 Benin (a national language along with Aja-Gbe, Anii, Bariba, Biali, Boko, Dendi, Fon-Gbe, Foodo, Fula, Gen-Gbe, Lukpa, Nateni, Tammari, Waama, Waci-Gbe, Yobe, Yom, Xwela-Gbe, Yoruba, the official languages is French)

Meitei (officially known as Manipuri) 
 India (along with 21 other scheduled languages recognised by the 8th schedule of the Indian Constitution) 

Mongolian:
 Mongolia

Montenegrin:
 Montenegro

Mossi:
 Burkina Faso (a national language along with Dioula, Fula and other languages, the official language is French)

N 
Nambya:
 Zimbabwe (with English, Shona, Ndebele, Chewa, Chirbawe, Kalanga, "Koisan" (Tshuwau), Ndau, Zimbabwean sign language, Tonga, Tswana, Venda, Xhosa)

Nateni:
 Benin (a national language along with Aja-Gbe, Anii, Bariba, Biali, Boko, Dendi, Fon-Gbe, Foodo, Fula, Gen-Gbe, Lukpa, Mbelime, Tammari, Waama, Waci-Gbe, Yobe, Yom, Xwela-Gbe, Yoruba, the official languages is French)

Nauruan
 Nauru (with English)

Ndau:
 Zimbabwe (with English, Shona, Ndebele, Chewa, Chirbawe, Kalanga, "Koisan" (Tshuwau), Nambya, Zimbabwean sign language, Tonga, Tswana, Venda, Xhosa)

Ndebele (Northern):
 South Africa (with Afrikaans, English, Northern Sotho, Sotho, Swati, Tsonga, Tswana, Venda, Xhosa, Zulu)
 Zimbabwe (with English, Shona, Chewa, Chirbawe, Kalanga, "Koisan" (Tshuwau), Nambya, Ndau, Zimbabwean sign language, Tonga, Tswana, Venda, Xhosa)

Ndebele (Southern):
 South Africa (with Afrikaans, English, Northern Sotho, Sotho, Swati, Tsonga, Tswana, Venda, Xhosa, Zulu)

Nepali:
 Nepal

New Zealand Sign Language:
 New Zealand (with English and Māori)

Noon:
 Senegal (a national language along with Balanta, Bassari, Bedik, Fula, Hassaniya, Jola, Mandinka, Mandjak, Mankanya, Safen, Serer, Soninke, Wolof, the official language is French)

Northern Sotho:
 South Africa (with Afrikaans, English, Ndebele, Sotho, Swati, Tsonga, Tswana, Venda, Xhosa, Zulu)

Norwegian:
 Norway (two official written forms – Bokmål and Nynorsk)

Nzema:
 Ghana (a government-sponsored language along with Akan (Akuapem Twi, Ashante Twi, Fante), Ewe-Gbe, Dagaare, Dagbani, Dangme, Ga, Gonja, Kasem, the official language is English)

O 
Oniyan:
 Guinea (a national language along with Fula, Kissi, Kpelle, Malinke, Susu, Toma, Wamey, the official language is French)

Oriya

Oromo:
 Ethiopia

Ossetian:
 South Ossetia (with Russian and Georgian; independence is disputed)

P 
Palauan:
 Palau (with English)

Papiamento:
 Aruba (with Dutch)
 Curaçao (with Dutch and English)
 Netherlands (Bonaire)

Pashto:
 Afghanistan (with Dari in Afghanistan)

Persian:
 Iran
 Afghanistan (called Dari in Afghanistan; with Pashto)
 Tajikistan (called Tajiki in Tajikistan; with Russian for "inter-ethnic communication")

Polish:
 Poland

Portuguese:
 Angola
 Brazil
 Cape Verde
 East Timor (with Tetum)
 Equatorial Guinea (with Spanish and French)
 Guinea-Bissau
 Macau (with Cantonese)
 Mozambique
 Portugal
 São Tomé and Príncipe

Punjabi:
 India

Q 
Quechua:
 Bolivia (with Spanish, Aymara, Guaraní and 33 other languages)
 Peru (with Spanish and Aymara)

R 

Romanian:
 Romania
 Moldova

Romansh:
 National language in Switzerland (with German, French, and Italian)
 Official language in canton of Grisons (with German and Italian)

Russian:
 Russia (in some regions together with regional languages)
 Abkhazia (with Abkhaz according to the Abkhazian constitution; independence is disputed)
 Belarus (with Belarusian)
 Kazakhstan (with Kazakh)
 Kyrgyzstan (with Kyrgyz)
 South Ossetia (with Ossetian and Georgian; independence is disputed)
 Tajikistan ("inter-ethnic communication"; with Tajik)
 Transnistria (with Moldovan and Ukrainian; independence is disputed)

S 

Safen:
 Senegal (a national language along with Balanta, Bassari, Bedik, Fula, Hassaniya, Jola, Mandinka, Mandjak, Mankanya, Noon, Serer, Soninke, Wolof, the official language is French)

Samoa
 Samoa (with English)

Sango
 Sao Pauloan Brazilian Portuguese (Portugues)
 Central African Republic (with French)

Sena:
 Zimbabwe as Chirbawe (with English, Shona, Ndebele, Chewa, Kalanga, "Koisan" (Tshuwau), Nambya, Ndau, Zimbabwean sign language, Tonga, Tswana, Venda, Xhosa)
Scots

 Scotland (With English and Scots Gaelic)

Serbian:
 Serbia
 Bosnia and Herzegovina (with Bosnian, Croatian) (de facto)
 Kosovo (independence is disputed; with Albanian)

Serer:
 Senegal (a national language along with Balanta, Bassari, Bedik, Fula, Hassaniya, Jola, Mandinka, Mandjak, Mankanya, Noon, Safen, Soninke, Wolof, the official language is French)

Seychellois Creole
 Seychelles (with French and English)

Shona:
 Zimbabwe (with English, Ndebele, Chewa, Chirbawe, Kalanga, "Koisan" (Tshuwau), Nambya, Ndau, Zimbabwean sign language, Tonga, Tswana, Venda, Xhosa)

Sinhala:
 Sri Lanka (with Tamil, and with English as a link language)

Slovak:
 Slovakia
 Czech Republic

Slovene:
 Slovenia

Somali:
 Djibouti (with Arabic, French, Afar)
 Somalia (with Arabic)
 Somaliland (with Arabic and English; independence is disputed)

Songhay-Zarma:
 Mali (a national language along with Bambara, Bomu, Bozo, Dogon, Fula, Mamara, Soninke, Syenara, Tamasheq, the official language is French)
 Niger (with French, Arabic, Buduma, Fula, Gourmanché, Hausa, Kanuri, Tamasheq, Tasawaq, Tebu)

Soninke:
 Mali (a national language along with Bambara, Bomu, Bozo, Dogon, Fula, Mamara, Songhay, Syenara, Tamasheq, the official language is French)
 Mauritania (a national language along with Fula, Wolof, the official language is Arabic)
 Senegal (a national language along with Balanta, Bassari, Bedik, Fula, Hassaniya, Jola, Mandinka, Mandjak, Mankanya, Noon, Safen, Serer, Wolof, the official language is French)

Sotho:
 Lesotho (with English)
 South Africa (with Afrikaans, English, Ndebele, Northern Sotho, Swati, Tsonga, Tswana, Venda, Xhosa, Zulu)

Spanish:
 Argentina (de facto)
 Bolivia (with Aymara, Quechua, Guaraní, and 33 other languages)
 Chile
 Easter Island (with Rapa Nui)
 Colombia
 Costa Rica
 Cuba
 Dominican Republic
 Ecuador (de facto)
 El Salvador
 Equatorial Guinea (with French and Portuguese)
 Guatemala
 Honduras
 Mexico (de facto)
 Nicaragua
 Panama
 Paraguay (with Guaraní)
 Peru (with Aymara, Quechua and other languages)
 Spain (Aranese, Basque, Catalan, and Galician are co-official in some regions)
 United States (in the US territory of Puerto Rico)
 Uruguay (de facto)
 Venezuela
 Western Sahara (with Arabic)

Susu:
 Guinea (a national language along with Fula, Kissi, Kpelle, Malinke, Toma, Oniyan, Wamey, the official language is French)

Swahili:
 Kenya (with English)
 Rwanda (with English, French and Kinyarwanda)
 Tanzania (de facto; with English)
 Uganda (since 2005; with English)

Swati:
 Eswatini (with English)
 South Africa (with Afrikaans, English, Ndebele, Northern Sotho, Sotho, Tsonga, Tswana, Venda, Xhosa, Zulu)

Swedish:
 Sweden
 Finland (with Finnish)
 Åland (monolingually Swedish) (an autonomous province under Finnish sovereignty)

Syenara:
 Mali (a national language along with Bambara, Bomu, Bozo, Dogon, Fula, Mamara, Songhay, Soninke, Tamasheq, the official language is French)

T 

Taiwan Sign Language:
 Taiwan (other national languages of Taiwan are Mandarin, Formosan languages, Hakka and Taiwanese Hokkien.)

Taiwanese Hokkien:
 Taiwan (using Traditional Chinese characters and/or pe̍h-oē-jī (Latin letters); other national languages of Taiwan are Mandarin, Formosan languages, Hakka and Taiwan Sign Language.)

Tajik:
 Tajikistan (a variant of Persian written in Cyrillic)

Tagalog:
 see Filipino 

Tamasheq:
 Mali (a national language along with Bambara, Bomu, Bozo, Dogon, Fula, Mamara, Songhay, Soninke, Syenara, the official language is French)
 Niger (with French, Arabic, Buduma, Fula, Gourmanché, Hausa, Kanuri, Songhay-Zarma, Tasawaq, Tebu)

Tamil:
 India (with 21 other languages, and with English as a link language)
 Singapore (with English, Chinese and Malay)
 Sri Lanka (with Sinhala, and with English as a link language)

Tammari:
 Benin (a national language along with Aja-Gbe, Anii, Bariba, Biali, Boko, Dendi, Fon-Gbe, Foodo, Fula, Gen-Gbe, Lukpa, Mbelime, Nateni, Waama, Waci-Gbe, Yobe, Yom, Xwela-Gbe, Yoruba, the official languages is French)

Tasawaq:
 Niger (with French, Arabic, Buduma, Fula, Gourmanché, Hausa, Kanuri, Songhay-Zarma, Tamasheq, Tebu)

Tebu:
 Niger (with French, Arabic, Buduma, Fula, Gourmanché, Hausa, Kanuri, Songhay-Zarma, Tamasheq, Tasawaq)

Telugu:
 India (with 21 other regional Languages, and with English as a link language)

Tetum:
 East Timor (with Portuguese)

Thai:
 Thailand

Tigrinya:
 Eritrea (with Arabic and English)

Tok Pisin:
 Papua New Guinea (with English and Hiri Motu)

Toma:
 Guinea (a national language along with Fula, Kissi, Kpelle, Malinke, Susu, Oniyan, Wamey, the official language is French)

Tonga:
 Zimbabwe (with English, Shona, Ndebele, Chewa, Chirbawe, Kalanga, "Koisan" (Tshuwau), Nambya, Ndau, Zimbabwean sign language, Tswana, Venda, Xhosa)

Tongan
 Tonga (with English)

Tsonga:
 South Africa (with Afrikaans, English, Ndebele, Northern Sotho, Sotho, Swati, Tswana, Venda, Xhosa, Zulu)

Tswana:
 Botswana (with English)
 South Africa (with Afrikaans, English, Ndebele, Northern Sotho, Sotho, Swati, Tsonga, Venda, Xhosa, Zulu)
 Zimbabwe (with English, Shona, Ndebele, Chewa, Chirbawe, Kalanga, "Koisan" (Tshuwau), Nambya, Ndau, Zimbabwean sign language, Tonga, Venda, Xhosa)

Turkish:
 Turkey
 Cyprus (with Greek)
 Turkish Republic of Northern Cyprus (independence disputed)

Turkmen:
 Turkmenistan

Tuvaluan
 Tuvalu (with English)

U 

Ukrainian:
 Ukraine
 Transnistria (with Moldovan and Russian; independence is disputed)

Urdu:
 Pakistan (with English)
 India (Urdu dialect and in script it is Sanscrit with 21 other regional languages, and with English as a link language)
 Fiji (with English and Bau Fijian; known constitutionally as Hindustani as an umbrella term to cover Urdu, as well as Hindi.)

Uzbek:
 Uzbekistan

V 

Venda:
 South Africa (with Afrikaans, English, Ndebele, Northern Sotho, Sotho, Swati, Tsonga, Tswana, Xhosa, Zulu)
 Zimbabwe (with English, Shona, Ndebele, Chewa, Chirbawe, Kalanga, "Koisan" (Tshuwau), Nambya, Ndau, Zimbabwean sign language, Tonga, Tswana, Xhosa)

Vietnamese:
 Vietnam

W 
Waama:
 Benin (a national language along with Aja-Gbe, Anii, Bariba, Biali, Boko, Dendi, Fon-Gbe, Foodo, Fula, Gen-Gbe, Lukpa, Mbelime, Nateni, Tammari, Waci-Gbe, Yobe, Yom, Xwela-Gbe, Yoruba, the official languages is French)

Waci-Gbe:
 Benin (a national language along with Aja-Gbe, Anii, Bariba, Biali, Boko, Dendi, Fon-Gbe, Foodo, Fula, Gen-Gbe, Lukpa, Mbelime, Nateni, Tammari, Waama, Yobe, Yom, Xwela-Gbe, Yoruba, the official languages is French)

Wamey:
 Guinea (a national language along with Fula, Kissi, Kpelle, Malinke, Susu, Toma, Oniyan, the official language is French)

Welsh:
 United Kingdom (limited de jure official status in Wales)

Wolof:
 Mauritania (a national language along with Fula, Soninke, the official language is Arabic)
 Senegal (a national language along with Balanta, Bassari, Bedik, Fula, Hassaniya, Jola, Mandinka, Mandjak, Mankanya, Noon, Safen, Serer, Soninke, the official language is French)

X 

Xhosa:
 South Africa (with Afrikaans, English, Ndebele, Northern Sotho, Sotho, Swati, Tsonga, Tswana, Venda, Zulu)
 Zimbabwe (with English, Shona, Ndebele, Chewa, Chirbawe, Kalanga, "Koisan" (Tshuwau), Nambya, Ndau, Zimbabwean sign language, Tonga, Tswana, Venda)

Xwela-Gbe:
 Benin (a national language along with Aja-Gbe, Anii, Bariba, Biali, Boko, Dendi, Fon-Gbe, Foodo, Fula, Gen-Gbe, Lukpa, Mbelime, Nateni, Tammari, Waama, Waci-Gbe, Yobe, Yom, Yoruba, the official languages is French)

Y 
Yobe:
 Benin (a national language along with Aja-Gbe, Anii, Bariba, Biali, Boko, Dendi, Fon-Gbe, Foodo, Fula, Gen-Gbe, Lukpa, Mbelime, Nateni, Tammari, Waama, Waci-Gbe, Yom, Xwela-Gbe, Yoruba, the official languages is French)

Yom:
 Benin (a national language along with Aja-Gbe, Anii, Bariba, Biali, Boko, Dendi, Fon-Gbe, Foodo, Fula, Gen-Gbe, Lukpa, Mbelime, Nateni, Tammari, Waama, Waci-Gbe, Yobe, Xwela-Gbe, Yoruba, the official languages is French)

Yoruba:
 Benin (a national language along with Aja-Gbe, Anii, Bariba, Biali, Boko, Dendi, Fon-Gbe, Foodo, Fula, Gen-Gbe, Lukpa, Mbelime, Nateni, Tammari, Waama, Waci-Gbe, Yobe, Xwela-Gbe, Yom, the official languages is French)
 Nigeria (with English, Hausa and Igbo)

Z 
Zimbabwean sign language:
 Zimbabwe (with English, Shona, Ndebele, Chewa, Chirbawe, Kalanga, "Koisan" (Tshuwau), Nambya, Ndau, Tonga, Tswana, Venda, Xhosa)

Zulu:
 South Africa (with Afrikaans, English, Ndebele, Northern Sotho, Sotho, Swati, Tsonga, Tswana, Venda, Xhosa)

Number of countries with the same official language 

This is a ranking of languages by number of sovereign countries in which they are de jure or de facto official (or with a national language status). An '*' (asterisk) indicates a country whose independence is disputed.

Partially recognised or de facto independent countries are denoted by an asterisk (*)

Official regional and minority languages 

Abaza:
 Karachay–Cherkessia (state language; with Cherkess, Karachay, Nogai and Russian)

Adyghe:
 Adygea (state language; with Russian)

Aghul:
 Dagestan (as one of the Dagestan peoples languages; with Russian)

Aklanon:
 Visayas (Philippines) (with Filipino, English, Bikol, Cebuano, Hiligaynon, Ilocano, Kinaray-a, Surigaonon, Tagalog, and Waray)

Albanian:
 Kosovo
 North Macedonia (in some municipalities)
 Montenegro (with Montenegrin, Serbian, Bosnian and Croatian)

Altay:
 Altay, Republic of (state language; with Russian)

Arabic:
 Philippines (mainly in Mindanao)

Aranese see Occitan

Armenian:
 Nagorno Karabagh

Assamese:
 India (with Hindi, English {as a "subsidiary official language"} and 20 other official languages)
 Assam

Avar:
 Dagestan (as one of the Dagestan peoples languages; with Russian)

Azeri:
 Dagestan (as one of the Dagestan peoples languages; with Russian)

Balkar:
 Kabardino-Balkaria (state language; with Kabardian and Russian)

Bashkir:
 Bashkortostan (state language; with Russian)

Basque:
 Basque Autonomous Community (with Spanish)
 Navarre (in some areas with Spanish)

Bengali:
 India (as a "subsidiary official language"} and 20 other official languages; second most spoken Indian Language)
 Andaman and Nicobar Islands
 Assam
 Tripura
 West Bengal

Bikol:
 Luzon and Visayas (Philippines) (with Filipino, English, Aklanon, Cebuano, Hiligaynon, Ibanag, Ilocano, Ivatan, Kapampangan, Kinaray-a, Pangasinan, Sambal, Surigaonon, Tagalog, and Waray)

Bosnian:
 part of Serbia
 Sandžak region
 Montenegro (with Montenegrin, Albanian, Croatian and Serbian)

Buryat:
 Buryatia (state language; with Russian)
 Zabaykalsky Krai
 Agin-Buryat Okrug (authorized language)

Cantonese Chinese:
China:
 Some provinces Canton Province (with Mandarin)
 Hong Kong (for Chinese language, Cantonese is spoken de facto; co-official with English)
 Macau (for Chinese language, Cantonese is spoken de facto; co-official with Portuguese)

Catalan:
 parts of Spain
 Balearic Islands (with Spanish)
 Catalonia (with Spanish)
 Valencia (named as Valencian, with Spanish)
 parts of France
 Pyrénées Orientales
 parts of Italy
 Alghero

Cebuano:
 Visayas and Mindanao (Philippines) (with Filipino, English, Aklanon, Bikol, Chavacano, Hiligaynon, Ilocano, Kinaray-a, Maguindanao, Maranao, Surigaonon, Tagalog, Tausug, Waray, and Yakan)

Chavacano:
 Mindanao (Philippines) (with Filipino, English, Cebuano, Hiligaynon, Ilocano, Maguindanao, Maranao, Surigaonon, Tagalog, Tausug, and Yakan)

Chechen:
 Chechnya (state language; with Russian)
 Dagestan (as one of the Dagestan peoples languages; with Russian)

Cherkess:
 Karachay–Cherkessia (state language; with Abaza, Karachay, Nogai and Russian)

Cherokee:
 Cherokee Nation tribal jurisdiction area in Oklahoma, United States.

Chipewyan:
 Northwest Territories (with Cree, English, French, Gwich'in, Innuinaqtun, Inuktitut, Inuvialuktun, North Slavey, South Slavey and Tłįchǫ (Dogrib))

Chukchi:
 Sakha (local official language; in localities with Chukchi population)

Chuvash:
 Chuvashia (state language; with Russian)

Cree:
 Northwest Territories (with Chipewyan, English, French, Gwich'in, Innuinaqtun, Inuktitut, Inuvialuktun, North Slavey, South Slavey and Tłįchǫ (Dogrib))

Crimean Tatar
 Crimea (with Russian and Ukrainian)

Croatian:
 part of Austria
 Burgenland (with German and Hungarian)*part of Italy
 Molise
 part of Serbia
 Vojvodina (with Hungarian, Pannonian Rusyn, Romanian, Serbian and Slovak)
 Montenegro (with Montenegrin, Albanian, Bosnian and Serbian)

Dargwa:
 Dagestan (as one of the Dagestan peoples languages; with Russian)

Dolgan:
 Sakha (local official language; in localities with Dolgan population)

Dutch:
 The Nord-Pas-de-Calais (France) (French Flemish dialect with French, English for some part of the region)

English:
 parts of Canada:

Alberta
British Columbia
Manitoba (with French)
Newfoundland and Labrador
Nova Scotia
Ontario
Prince Edward Island
Quebec
Saskatchewan
New Brunswick (with French)
Northwest Territories (with Chipewyan, Cree, French, Gwich'in, Inuinnaqtun, Inuktitut, Inuvialuktun, Slavey (North and South) and Tłįchǫ)
Nunavut (with Inuktitut, Inuinnaqtun, and French)
Yukon (with French)
 The United Kingdom:
England
Northern Ireland
Scotland (with Scottish Gaelic in some municipalities)
Wales (with Welsh)
Isle of Man (with Manx Gaelic)
Guernsey (with French)
Jersey (with French)
 parts of the United States. See English-only movement. English is an official language in the following states and territories:
 Alabama
 Alaska
 Arkansas
 California
 Colorado
 Florida
 Georgia
 Hawaii (with Hawaiian language)
 Illinois
 Indiana
 Iowa
 Kentucky
 Massachusetts
 Minnesota
 Mississippi
 Montana
 Nebraska
 New Hampshire
 North Carolina
 North Dakota
 Puerto Rico (with Spanish)
 South Carolina
 South Dakota (with Lakota & Dakota)
 Texas
 Tennessee
 U.S. Virgin Islands
 Utah
 Virginia
 West Virginia
 Wyoming

Erzya:
 Mordovia (state language; with Moksha and Russian)

Even:
 Sakha (local official language; in localities with Even population)

Evenki:
 Sakha (local official language; in localities with Evenki population)

Faroese:
 Faroe Islands (with Danish)

Finnish:
 Karelia (authorized language; with Karelian and Veps)

French:
 parts of Canada

New Brunswick (co-official with English)
Northwest Territories (with Chipewyan, Cree, English, Gwich'in, Inuinnaqtun, Inuktitut, Inuvialuktun, Slavey (North and South) and Tłįchǫ)
Nunavut (with English, Inuinnaqtun, Inuktitut)
Quebec
Yukon (with English)
 Guernsey (with English)
 Jersey (with English)
 Puducherry (co-official with Tamil in the Union Territory of Puducherry. Also Telugu and Malayalam are its regional official languages)
 part of Italy
 Aosta (co-official with Italian)
 part of United States with Louisiana

Frisian (West):
 The Netherlands: co-official in the province of Friesland (with Dutch)

Friulian:
 The Friuli region of northeastern Italy

Gagauz:

 Gagauzia (Moldova) (with Russian)

Galician:
 part of Spain
 Galicia (with Spanish)

German:
 Italy
 South Tyrol (together with Italian and Ladin)

Greek:
 parts of south Albania
 parts of south Italy
 Salento (Grecia Salentina, together with Italian)
 Calabria (Bovesia, together with Italian)

Guaraní:
 Bolivia
 Paraguay
 in Argentina
 Corrientes Province (co-official with Spanish)

Gujarati:
 India (with 21 other regional languages)
 Dadra and Nagar Haveli and Daman and Diu
 Gujarat

Gwich'in:
 Northwest Territories (with Cree, Chipewyan, English, French, Innuinaqtun, Inuktitut, Inuvialuktun, North Slavey, South Slavey and Tłįchǫ (Dogrib))

Hawaiian:
 Hawaii (with English)

Hiligaynon:
 Visayas and Mindanao (Philippines) (with Filipino, English, Aklanon, Bikol, Cebuano, Chavacano, Hiligaynon, Ilocano, Kinaray-a, Maguindanao, Maranao, Surigaonon, Tagalog, Tausug, Waray, and Yakan)
Hindi:
 India (with 21 other regional languages)
 Andaman and Nicobar Islands
 Bihar 
Chhattisgarh 
 Delhi Territory
Haryana 
Jharkhand 
Madhya Pradesh 
Rajasthan 
Uttarakhand
 Uttar Pradesh 
Hungarian:
 part of Serbia
 Vojvodina (with Croatian, Serbian, Romanian, Slovak and Ruthenian)
 part of Romania
 part of Slovenia
 part of Croatia
 part of Slovakia
 part of Austria

Ibanag:
 Luzon (Philippines) (with Filipino, English, Bikol, Ilocano, Ivatan, Kapampangan, Pangasinan, Sambal, and Tagalog)

Ilocano:
 Luzon and Mindanao (Philippines) (with Filipino, English, Bikol, Cebuano, Chavacano, Hiligaynon, Ibanag, Ilocano, Ivatan, Kapampangan, Maguindanao, Maranao, Pangasinan, Sambal, Surigaonon, Tagalog, Tausug, and Yakan.)

Ingush:
 Ingushetia (state language; with Russian)

Inuinnaqtun:
 Northwest Territories (with Cree, Chipewyan, English, French, Gwich'in, Inuktitut, Inuvialuktun, North Slavey, South Slavey and Tłįchǫ (Dogrib))
 Nunavut (with English, French, and Inuktitut)

Inuktitut:
 Nunavut (with English, French, and Inuinnaqtun)
 Northwest Territories (with Cree, Chipewyan, English, French, Gwich'in, Inuinnaqtun, Inuvialuktun, North Slavey, South Slavey and Tłįchǫ (Dogrib))

Inuvialuktun:
 Northwest Territories (with Cree, Chipewyan, English, French, Gwich'in, Innuinaqtun, Inuktitut, North Slavey, South Slavey and Tłįchǫ (Dogrib))

Irish:
 Northern Ireland (United Kingdom) (along with Ulster Scots and English)

Italian:
 part of Croatia
 Istria county (with Croatian)
 part of Slovenia
 Izola, Koper and Piran municipalities (with Slovene)

Ivatan:
 Luzon (Philippines) (with Filipino, English, Bikol, Ibanag, Ilocano, Kapampangan, Pangasinan, Sambal, and Tagalog)

Japanese:
 Part of Palau
 Angaur (with English)

Kabardian:
 Kabardino-Balkaria (state language; with Balkar and Russian)

Kalaallisut:
 Greenland

Kalmyk:
 Kalmykia (state language; with Russian)

Kannada:
 India (with 21 other regional languages)

Kapampangan:
 Luzon (Philippines) (with Filipino, English, Bikol, Ilocano, Ibanag, Ivatan, Pangasinan, Sambal, and Tagalog)

Karachay:
 Karachay–Cherkessia (state language; with Abaza, Cherkess, Nogai and Russian)

Karelian:
 Karelia (authorized language; with Finnish and Veps)

Kashmiri:
 India (with 21 other regional languages)
 Jammu and Kashmir

Kazakh:
 Republic of Altay (official language; in localities with Kazakh population)
 part of the People's Republic of China
 Ili, with Chinese (Mandarin)
 Barkol, with Chinese (Mandarin)
 Mori, with Chinese (Mandarin)
 part of Mongolia
 Mori, with Mongolian

Khakas:
 Khakassia (state language; with Russian)

Khanty:
 Khanty–Mansi Autonomous Okrug (aboriginal language; with Mansi and Nenets)
 Yamalo-Nenets Autonomous Okrug (aboriginal language; with Nenets and Selkup)

Kinaray-a:
 Visayas (Philippines) (with Filipino, English, Aklanon, Bikol, Cebuano, Hiligaynon, Surigaonon, Tagalog, and Waray)

Komi:
 Komi (state language; with Russian)

Komi-Permyak:
 Perm Krai
 Komi-Permyak Okrug (official language)

Korean:
 part of the People's Republic of China with Chinese (Mandarin)
 Changbai (Jangbaek, Changbaek)
 Yanbian (Yeonbyeon, Yŏnbyŏn)

Kumyk:
 Dagestan (as one of the Dagestan peoples languages; with Russian)

Kyrgyz:
 part of the People's Republic of China
 Kizilsu (with Chinese (Mandarin))

Lak:
 Dagestan (as one of the Dagestan peoples languages; with Russian)

Lezgian:
 Dagestan (as one of the Dagestan peoples languages; with Russian)

Macedonian
 part of Albania
 part of Serbia

Maguindanao:
 Mindanao (Philippines) (with Filipino, English, Cebuano, Chavacano, Hiligaynon, Ilocano, Maranao, Surigaonon, Tagalog, Tausug, and Yakan)

Malayalam:
 India (with 21 other regional languages)
 Kerala
 Puducherry
 Lakshadweep

Mansi:
 Khanty–Mansi Autonomous Okrug (aboriginal language; with Khanty and Nenets)

Maranao:
 Mindanao (Philippines) (with Filipino, English, Cebuano, Chavacano, Hiligaynon, Ilocano, Maguindanao, Surigaonon, Tagalog, Tausug, and Yakan)

Marathi:
 India (with 21 other regional languages)
 Maharashtra
 Goa
 Dadra and Nagar Haveli and Daman and Diu

Mari (Hill and Meadow):
 Mari El (state language; with Russian)

Mayan:
 Mexico (*only recognized)
 Guatemala (*only recognized)
 Belize (*only recognized)
 Honduras (*only recognized)
 El Salvador (*only recognized)

Meitei (officially known as Manipuri):
 India (with 21 other official languages)
 Manipur 
 Tripura (formerly) 

Moksha:
 Mordovia (state language; with Erzya and Russian)

Mongolian:
 part of the People's Republic of China
 Inner Mongolia, with Chinese (Mandarin)
 Haixi, with Tibetan and Chinese (Mandarin)
 Bortala, with Chinese (Mandarin)
 Bayin'gholin, with Chinese (Mandarin)
 Dorbod, with Chinese (Mandarin)
 Qian Gorlos, with Chinese (Mandarin)
 Harqin Left, with Chinese (Mandarin)
 Fuxin, with Chinese (Mandarin)
 Weichang, with Chinese (Mandarin)
 Subei, with Chinese (Mandarin)
 Henan, with Chinese (Mandarin)

Náhuatl:
 Mexico (*only recognized)
 El Salvador (*only recognized)

Nenets:
 Khanty–Mansi Autonomous Okrug (aboriginal language; with Khanty and Mansi)
 Yamalo-Nenets Autonomous Okrug (aboriginal language; with Khanty and Selkup)

Nepali:
 India (with 21 other regional languages)

Nogai:
 Dagestan (as one of the Dagestan peoples languages; with Russian)
 Karachay–Cherkessia (state language; with Abaza, Cherkess, Karachay and Russian)

Occitan:
 Catalonia, with Catalan and Spanish)

Odia:
 India (with 21 other regional languages)
 Odisha

Ossetic (Digor and Iron dialects):
 North Ossetia—Alania (state language; with Russian)

Pangasinan:
 Luzon (Philippines) (with Filipino, English, Bikol, Ibanag, Ilocano, Ivatan, Kapampangan, Sambal, and Tagalog)

Portuguese:
 part of the People's Republic of China
 Macau (with Chinese)

Punjabi:
 Pakistan
 Punjab
 India (with 21 other regional languages)
 Punjab
 Delhi

Romanian:
 Vojvodina (with Croatian, Serbian, Hungarian, Slovak and Ruthenian)

Russian. Russian is fixed as a state language in the Constitutions of the republics of the Russian Federation:
 Adygea (state language; with Adyghe)
 Altay, Republic of (state language; with Altay)
 Bashkortostan (state language; with Bashkir)
 Buryatia (state language; with Buryat)
 Chechnya (state language; with Chechen)
 Chuvashia (state language; with Chuvash)
 Dagestan (state language; with the languages of the Dagestan peoples)
 Ingushetia (state language; with Ingush)
 Kabardino-Balkaria (state language; with Balkar and Kabardian)
 Kalmykia (state language; with Kalmyk)
 Karachay–Cherkessia (state language; with Abaza, Cherkess, Karachay and Nogai)
 Karelia (state language)
 Khakassia (state language; with Khakas)
 Komi (state language; with Komi)
 Mari El (state language; with Mari (Hill and Meadow))
 Mordovia (state language; with Erzya and Moksha)
 North Ossetia—Alania (state language; with Ossetic)
 Sakha (state language; with Sakha)
 Tatarstan (state language; with Tatar)
 Tyva (state language; with Tuvan)
 Udmurtia (state language; with Udmurt)
 Russian (with Gagauz) is an official language of Gagauzia (autonomous republic within Moldova)

Rusyn:
 Vojvodina (with Croatian, Serbian, Romanian, Hungarian, Slovak)
 Ukraine
 Zakarapts'ka region (with Ukrainian, Hungarian)

Rutul:
 Dagestan (as one of the Dagestan peoples languages; with Russian)

Sakha:
 Sakha (state language; with Russian)

Sambal:
 Luzon (Philippines) (with Filipino, English, Bikol, Ibanag, Ilocano, Ivatan, Kapampangan, Pangasinan, and Tagalog)

Sami:
 Finland (in four municipalities)
 Norway (in six municipalities in two provinces)
 Sweden (in four municipalities and surrounding municipalities)

Sanskrit:
 Nepal

Saraiki
 Pakistan

Sarikoli:
 part of the People's Republic of China (It's different from Tajiki of Tajikistan)
 Taxkorgan (with Chinese (Mandarin))

Selkup:
 Yamalo-Nenets Autonomous Okrug (aboriginal language; with Khanty and Nenets)

Serbian:
 Croatia-Co-official minority language in municipalities: Borovo, Trpinja, Markušica, Negoslavci, Vukovar, Šodolovci, Erdut, Darda, Jagodnjak, Kneževi Vinogradi, Dvor, Gvozd, Biskupija, Ervenik, Kistanje, Gračac, Udbina, Vrbovsko, Donji Kukuruzari and Nijemci.

Sindhi:
 India (with 21 other regional languages)
 Pakistan (Official language in the Province of Sindh along with Urdu and English)

North and South Slavey:
 Northwest Territories (with Cree, Chipewyan, English, French, Gwich'in, Innuinaqtun, Inuktitut, Inuvialuktun, and Tłįchǫ (Dogrib))

Slovak:
 part of Serbia
 Vojvodina (with Croatian, Serbian, Hungarian, Romanian and Ruthenian)

Slovene:
 part of Italy
 Friuli-Venezia Giulia (with Italian, Friulian and German)
 part of Austria
 Carinthia (with German)

Spanish:
 New Mexico (spoken with English)
 Puerto Rico (with English)
 Philippines (mainly as Chavacano in Mindanao)
 El Cenizo, Texas

Surigaonon:
 Visayas and Mindanao (Philippines) (with Filipino, English, Aklanon, Bikol, Cebuano, Chavacano, Hiligaynon, Ilocano, Kinaray-a, Maguindanao, Maranao, Tagalog, Tausug, Waray, and Yakan)

Tabasaran:
 Dagestan (as one of the Dagestan peoples languages; with Russian)

Tagalog:
 Luzon, Visayas, and Mindanao (Philippines) (with Filipino, English, Aklanon, Bikol, Cebuano, Chavacano, Hiligaynon, Ibanag, Ilocano, Ivatan, Kapampangan, Kinaray-a, Maguindanao, Maranao, Pangasinan, Sambal, Surigaonon, Tausug, Waray, and Yakan)

Tahitian:
 French Polynesia (with French)

Tamil:
 India (with 21 other regional languages)
 Andaman and Nicobar Islands
 Puducherry
 Tamil Nadu
 Sri Lanka
 Singapore

Tat:
 Dagestan (as one of the Dagestan peoples languages; with Russian)

Tatar:
 Tatarstan (state language; with Russian)

Tausug:
 Mindanao (Philippines) (with Filipino, English, Cebuano, Chavacano, Hiligaynon, Ilocano, Maguindanao, Surigaonon, Tagalog, Maranao, and Yakan)

Telugu:
 India (with 21 other regional languages)
 Andhra Pradesh
 Telangana
 Puducherry
 Andaman and Nicobar Islands

Tibetan:
 Tibet Autonomous Region (with Chinese (Mandarin))
 Aba (with Chinese (Mandarin))
 Garzê (with Chinese (Mandarin))
 Dêqên (with Chinese (Mandarin))
 Wenshan (with Chinese (Mandarin))
 Gannan (with Chinese (Mandarin))
 Haibai (with Chinese (Mandarin))
 Hainan (with Chinese (Mandarin))
 Huangnan (with Chinese (Mandarin))
 Golog (with Chinese (Mandarin))
 Gyêgu (with Chinese (Mandarin))
 Haixi (with Mongolian and Chinese (Mandarin))
 Muli (with Chinese (Mandarin))
 Tianzhu (with Chinese (Mandarin))

Tłįchǫ:
 Northwest Territories (with Cree, Chipewyan, English, French, Gwich'in, Innuinaqtun, Inuktitut, Inuvialuktun, North Slavey, and South Slavey)

Tsakhur:
 Dagestan (as one of the Dagestan peoples languages; with Russian)

Tswana:
 South Africa (with Afrikaans, English, Ndebele, Northern Sotho, Sotho, Swati, Tsonga, Venda, Xhosa, Zulu)

Turkish:
 North Macedonia in Plasnica and Centar Župa
 Kosovo in Prizren and Mamuša
 part of Bulgaria

Tuvan:
 Tyva (state language; with Russian)

Udmurt:
 Udmurtia (state language; with Russian)

Urdu:
 Pakistan (with English as co-official language) 
 India (with 21 other regional languages)
 Jammu and Kashmir
 Delhi Territory
 Uttar Pradesh state
 Bihar state
 Andhra Pradesh mainly in Hyderabad (former princely state of Nizam) and adjacent areas of Maharashtra and Karnataka

Uyghur:
 Xinjiang (with Chinese (Mandarin))

Veps:
 Karelia (authorized language; with Finnish and Karelian)

Vietnamese:
 Guangxi Province, China (some regional status)
 Part of Cambodia
 Part of Laos

Waray:
 Visayas (Philippines) (with Filipino, English, Aklanon, Cebuano, Hiligaynon, Kinaray-a, and Tagalog)

Welsh:
 Wales (United Kingdom) (with English)

Yakan:
 Mindanao (Philippines) (with Filipino, English, Cebuano, Chavacano, Hiligaynon, Ilocano, Maguindanao, Maranao, Surigaonon, Tagalog, and Tausug)

Yiddish:
 Russia (only in Jewish Autonomous Oblast, with Russian)

Yukaghir:
 Sakha (local official language; in localities with Yukaghir population)

Zhuang:
 Guangxi (with Chinese (Mandarin))
 Lianshan (with Chinese (Mandarin))

Official languages of supra-national institutions 
Different organisations sometimes refer to their principal languages of administration and communication as "working languages", whilst others refer to these as being "official".

See also 
 List of official languages by institution
 List of official languages by state
 List of languages without official status
 National language

Notes

References 

Language policy
Lists of languages